Where's Waldo? The Fantastic Journey, known as Where's Wally? The Fantastic Journey in the United Kingdom, is a video game published by Ubisoft and developed by Ludia based on the book of the same name. It is a puzzle adventure game released for the Nintendo DS, Wii, Microsoft Windows, and the iPhone, and is also a remake of The Great Waldo Search, released in 1992.

Gameplay
Like the other games in the series, the object of the game is to search for hidden characters and items within a time limit. Hints are awarded to the player through Woof, Waldo's pet dog. Woof alerts the players when they are near an object they are searching for. Players wanting to use this ability more often must collect 'Woof Bones' to prolong the effect.

Unlike the NES video game adaptation of Where's Waldo? and The Great Waldo Search, which relied on a directional pad to search for targets, this game allows players to utilize superior pointer-based motion controls (the Wii Remote's infrared sensor, the DS and iPhone's touchscreen, or a mouse, depending on the platform) to easily seek desired search targets.

References

External links
Where's Waldo? The Fantastic Journey

2009 video games
Adventure games
Games for Windows certified games
Microsoft games
Nintendo DS games
Puzzle video games
Ubisoft games
Video games developed in Canada
Video games based on Where's Waldo?
Wii games
WiiWare games
Windows games
IOS games
Ludia games
Multiplayer and single-player video games